The arrowtooth lizardfish (Synodus doaki) is a lizardfish of the family Synodontidae, found in isolate locations across the southwestern Pacific (namely Queensland, the Coral Sea, New Caledonia, Lord Howe Island, Norfolk Island and the North Island), at depths of between 9 and 200 m.  Its length is between 15 and 28 cm.

Published occurrences of Synodus doaki from the Hawaiian Islands, Indonesia, Philippines, Easter Island, and Fiji are now treated as the distinct species Synodus mundyi, S. fasciapelvicus, S. isolatus, S. pylei, and S. sanguineus.

References

 
 Tony Ayling & Geoffrey Cox, Collins Guide to the Sea Fishes of New Zealand,  (William Collins Publishers Ltd, Auckland, New Zealand 1982) 

arrowtooth lizardfish
Fish of the North Island
Fish of New Caledonia
Fauna of Queensland
Fish of Lord Howe Island
Fauna of Norfolk Island
Taxa named by Barry C. Russell
Taxa named by Roger Frank Cressey Jr.
arrowtooth lizardfish